John Anthony Emmanuel Amaratunga (Sinhala: ජෝන් ඇන්තනී එමානුවෙල් අමරතුංග) (born 21 May 1940) is a Sri Lankan politician and lawyer. He is a representative of Gampaha District for the United National Party in the Parliament of Sri Lanka. He resides in Kandana.He was the minister Tourism Development, Christian Religious Affairs and Land in the United National Party led government. He also held the powerful ministry of Interior in the 2001-2004 United National Party government.

Early life
Educated at De Mazenod College, Kandana and at Saint Joseph's College, Colombo. He studied law at the Ceylon Law College and became a proctor in July 1966. He setup his legal practice in Negombo, becoming a Notary Public and a Justice of the Peace and Unofficial magistrate.

Political career
Amaratunga joined the United National Party and became active in local politics. In 1978, while serving as chairman, Sri Lanka Leather Corporation; he succeeded Shelton Jayasinghe, Minister of Posts and Telecommunications as the Member of Parliament for the Wattala electorate following the sudden death of the later. He successfully held his seat in parliament in the successive elections from the Gampaha District. During his political career he held several appointments that included;

Organizer of the United National Party for Wattala Electorate
Chairman, Parliamentary Committee on Public Enterprises (1984-1993)
Acting Minister of Finance (1988-1989)
State Minister of Foreign Affairs (1989-1994)
Subject Minister for Provincial Councils (1990)  
Acting State Minister for Information (1990)  
Acting State Minister for Defense (1992)
Cabinet Minister of Home Affairs and Provincial Councils (1993-1994)
Cabinet Minister of Interior and Christian Affairs (2001-2004)
Chief Opposition Whip (2010-2015)
Cabinet Minister of Public Order, Disaster Management & Christian Affairs (Jan – Mar 2015)
Cabinet Minister of Public Order and Christian Religious Affairs (Mar 2015 – Aug 2015)
Cabinet Minister of Tourism Development and Christian Religious Affairs (Since Sep 2015)
Additional Ministerial Portfolio of Land (May 2016- Aug2017)
Member of the Working Committee of the United National Party
Chairman, United National Party Professional Group and Overseas Membership Development.
President - Jathika Sevaka Sangamaya Trade Union
Vice President World Tourism Organization - South Asia

Controversy

Fraudulent acquisition of property 
In 2018 John Amaratunga was accused of aiding the fraudulent acquisition of a property worth Rs. 7 Billion from an elderly couple, as well as holding them hostage. Eighty-six year-old Wimalsen Fernando and his wife Shiranie Fernando learnt that their property in Gregory's Road, Colombo was fraudulently acquired by a person named Prasad Deshapriya Vitharana of Kalubowila. When the property was visited by the couple they were held hostage by Amaratunga's guards. When the couple's lawyers attempted to enter the property they met Amaratunga in the property who used abusive language to threaten them and attempted to evict them; but the lawyers forced their way to the couple. The couple was threatened and  Vitharana had extorted money from them with death threats. The couple complained to the Cinnamon Gardens police, but they did not see an inquiry for more than five months and no statement was taken from Amaratunga. When the media questioned the police they claimed to be "unaware" of the incident. John Amaratunga accepted that the accused was a friend but denied the allegations that he abused his powers to stop the investigations or that to threatening the lawyers. Instead he claimed he only asked them to leave calling them trespassers.

References

 

Sinhalese lawyers
1940 births
Living people
Sri Lankan Roman Catholics
Members of the 8th Parliament of Sri Lanka
Members of the 9th Parliament of Sri Lanka
Members of the 10th Parliament of Sri Lanka
Members of the 11th Parliament of Sri Lanka
Members of the 12th Parliament of Sri Lanka
Members of the 13th Parliament of Sri Lanka
Members of the 14th Parliament of Sri Lanka
Members of the 15th Parliament of Sri Lanka
Cabinet ministers of Sri Lanka
United National Party politicians
Ministers of state of Sri Lanka
Non-cabinet ministers of Sri Lanka
Deputy ministers of Sri Lanka
Ceylonese proctors
Sri Lankan notaries